Henrik Stefan Järrel (born 9 November 1948 in Stockholm) is a former member of the Riksdag (as a Moderate), a Swedish TV personality and media consultant. He is the son of the actors Ingrid Backlin and Stig Järrel.

Järrel has been a member of the Riksdag 1991–1994, and then again 1995–2006, as a politician of the Moderate Party. He is as of June 2006 in the committee of the Constitution. Järrel is a devout supporter of the Swedish monarchy and founded a royalist network in the Riksdag.

References

External links
Official website

1948 births
Living people
Politicians from Stockholm
Members of the Riksdag from the Moderate Party
Members of the Riksdag 2002–2006